In plane geometry, the Conway circle theorem states that when the sides meeting at each vertex of a triangle are extended by the length of the opposite side, the six endpoints of the three resulting line segments lie on a circle whose centre is the incentre of the triangle. The circle on which these six points lie is called the Conway circle of the triangle.  The theorem and circle are named after mathematician John Horton Conway.

See also 
 List of things named after John Horton Conway

References

External links 
 

Theorems about triangles and circles
John Horton Conway